Heteroclinus whiteleggii, Whitelegg's weedfish, is a species of clinid native to reefs around New South Wales, Australia.  This species can reach a maximum length of  TL. The specific name honours the naturalist Thomas Whitelegge (1850-1927) who was a friend of Ogilby's friend and who collected the type.

References

whiteleggii
Taxa named by James Douglas Ogilby
Fish described in 1894
Fish of Australia